Miner County is a county in the U.S. state of South Dakota. As of the 2020 census, the population was 2,298. Its county seat is Howard. The county was created in 1873 and organized in 1880.

History
The area is situated on the site of Dakota Sioux trails that connected two sites of cultural significance to the Dakota people, the pipestone quarries in southwestern Minnesota and the Sioux Crossing of the Three Rivers, near present-day Fort Thompson. South Dakota Highway 34 now roughly follows this route.

The Fort Ridgely and South Pass Wagon Road, also known as Nobles Trail, the first road in Dakota Territory, passed through the area. It was made in 1857, connecting Fort Ridgley, Minnesota with South Pass in Wyoming Territory, along the Oregon Trail. The Minnesota and Powder River Road of 1865 also passed through the county.

The boundaries of present-day Miner County experienced several changes during territorial times. The county was established in 1873 by the Dakota Territorial Legislature when Hanson County was divided into several parts. It was named for Ephriam Miner, a territorial legislator, and Nelson Miner, a territorial legislator and captain in the 1st Dakota Cavalry. At the time, Miner County spanned the southern half of present-day Miner and Sanborn counties; Bramble County (now extinct) spanned the northern portion of these counties. In 1879 the legislature combined Miner, Bramble, and portions of Wetmore counties, and eliminated the latter two. The new Miner County was organized the following year with Forestburg as the county seat. In 1883 the county was divided; the western portion being renamed Sanborn County, and the eastern portion retaining the name Miner County. Howard was named the county seat of Miner County.

In 1881, the Milwaukee Road railroad opened tracks in Miner County that followed Fort Ridgely Road from east to west, connecting Madison to Woonsocket. The Chicago and North Western railroad opened tracks from Hawarden, Iowa, to Iroquois, crossing northwest across the county in 1882. These railroads have since abandoned their tracks in the county.

The first settler in Miner County was Matthew A. Moore, who homesteaded near the present site of Howard in the spring of 1879. Significant homesteading started in the latter part of 1879 and concluded in 1884, when all available government land had been claimed. Settlers were primarily Norwegian, German, Danish, Welsh, Irish and Swedish.

On August 28, 1884, the second known photograph of a tornado was taken in Miner County. See 1884 Howard, South Dakota tornado.

The current Miner County Courthouse was built in 1938 at a cost of $107,000 by the Great Depression-era Public Works Administration and was dedicated on September 26, 1938.

On June 13, 1943, two B-17 bombers from the 393rd Bomb Group of the Sioux City Army Air Base collided while on a training exercise over Miner County. One plane crashed immediately, and the other made a controlled landing in a creek bed several miles away. Eleven airmen were killed.

Geography
The terrain of Miner County consists of rolling hills, dotted with lakes and ponds, and generally devoted to agriculture. The terrain generally slopes to the south and southwest, with its highest point occurring along the north boundary line in the northeast part of the county, at 1,729' (530m) ASL.

Major highways
  U.S. Route 81
  South Dakota Highway 25
  South Dakota Highway 34

Adjacent counties

 Kingsbury County - north
 Lake County - east
 McCook County - southeast
 Hanson County - southwest
 Sanborn County - west

Protected areas

 Bitter Lake Public Shooting Area
 Burke Slough Public Shooting Area
 Morris Lake Public Shooting Area
 Twin Lakes Public Shooting Area

Lakes

 Bitter Lake
 Glee Lake
 Lake Carthage
 Lake Thompson
 Morris Lake
 Ness Chain Lake
 Stone House Lake
 Twin Lakes

Demographics

Census-designated places 

 Cloverleaf Colony
 Fedora
 Roswell
 Shannon Colony

2000 census
As of the 2000 United States Census, there were 2,884 people, 1,212 households, and 789 families in the county. The population density was 5 people per square mile (2/km2).  There were 1,408 housing units at an average density of 2 per square mile (1/km2). The racial makeup of the county was 98.75% White, 0.52% Black or African American, 0.31% Native American, 0.10% Asian, 0.10% from other races, and 0.21% from two or more races. 0.62% of the population were Hispanic or Latino of any race.

There were 1,212 households, out of which 28.20% had children under the age of 18 living with them, 56.50% were married couples living together, 5.40% had a female householder with no husband present, and 34.90% were non-families. 32.30% of all households were made up of individuals, and 16.90% had someone living alone who was 65 years of age or older. The average household size was 2.33 and the average family size was 2.98.

The county population contained 25.50% under the age of 18, 5.60% from 18 to 24, 22.70% from 25 to 44, 22.30% from 45 to 64, and 23.90% who were 65 years of age or older. The median age was 42 years. For every 100 females there were 99.60 males. For every 100 females age 18 and over, there were 97.00 males.

The median income for a household in the county was $29,519, and the median income for a family was $36,667. Males had a median income of $25,297 versus $20,469 for females. The per capita income for the county was $15,155. About 8.20% of families and 11.80% of the population were below the poverty line, including 14.70% of those under age 18 and 13.20% of those age 65 or over.

2010 census
As of the 2010 United States Census, there were 2,389 people, 1,032 households, and 606 families in the county. The racial makeup of the county was 97.8% white, 0.4% Asian, 0.2% American Indian, 0.1% black or African American, 0.7% from other races, and 0.8% from two or more races. Those of Hispanic or Latino origin made up 1.3% of the population. In terms of ancestry, 54.2% were German, 20.7% were Norwegian, 12.4% were Irish, 5.7% were English, 5.7% were Swedish, and 4.2% were American.

Of the 1,032 households, 24.8% had children under the age of 18 living with them, 50.3% were married couples living together, 5.6% had a female householder with no husband present, 41.3% were non-families, and 37.6% of all households were made up of individuals. The average household size was 2.24 and the average family size was 2.97. The median age was 46.4 years.

The median income for a household in the county was $43,958 and the median income for a family was $54,650. Males had a median income of $33,984 versus $25,221 for females. The per capita income for the county was $25,450. About 2.7% of families and 8.8% of the population were below the poverty line, including 8.2% of those under age 18 and 15.4% of those age 65 or over.

Communities

Cities
 Carthage
 Howard (county seat)

Towns
 Canova
 Vilas

Unincorporated community

 Epiphany (partial)

Ghost Town(s) 
 Argonne

Government

Townships

 Adams
 Beaver
 Belleview
 Canova
 Carthage
 Clearwater
 Clinton
 Grafton
 Green Valley
 Henden
 Howard
 Miner
 Redstone
 Rock Creek
 Roswell
 Vermillion

Politics
Miner County voters have tended to vote Republican the past two  decades.

See also
 1884 Howard, South Dakota tornado
 National Register of Historic Places listings in Miner County, South Dakota

References

External links

 

 
1880 establishments in Dakota Territory
Populated places established in 1880